Yoba is an extinct Austronesian language of Papua New Guinea. It was restructured through contact with neighboring Papuan languages, and in turn influencing them, before speakers shifted to those languages.

External links 
 Paradisec has the Tom Dutton collection (TD1) that includes Yoba language materials.

See also
Magori language, a similar situation

References

Central Papuan Tip languages
Languages of Central Province (Papua New Guinea)
Extinct languages of Oceania
Languages extinct in the 1980s